Doug Henwood (born December 7, 1952) is an American journalist, economic analyst, author, and financial trader who writes frequently about economic affairs. Until 2013, he published a newsletter, Left Business Observer, that analyzed economics and politics from a left-wing perspective. Henwood and Phillipa Dunne co-own and co-edit The Liscio Report, a newsletter focusing on macroeconomic analysis. Henwood is a contributing editor at The Nation.

Early life and education 
Henwood was born to Harold and Victorine Henwood in Teaneck, New Jersey, and grew up in Westwood, New Jersey. As a youth, he was acquainted with Marxism, but he briefly self-identified with conservatism toward the end of high school. According to Henwood: "Sometime late in high school, I fell under the spell of Milton Friedman and Bill Buckley, and about the first thing I did when I got to college was join the Party of the Right (POR). I got tired of all the pompous rituals, and political sanity returned, bringing me back to the left from which I'd started."

Henwood received a B.A. in English from Yale University in 1975. After college, he worked as secretary to the chair of a small Wall Street brokerage firm headed by a former Bell Labs physicist who used quantitative analysis techniques in the mid-1970s, predating the later widespread adoption of similar methods on Wall Street.

From 1976 to 1979, Henwood pursued a doctorate in English with a focus on British and American poetry and critical theory at the University of Virginia, but left before completing his dissertation. He then worked for two years as a copywriter and assistant to a medical publisher in New York.

Career

Writing 
In September 1986, Henwood launched Left Business Observer (LBO). Topics he has covered include:
 income distribution and poverty in the U.S. and elsewhere in the First World
 the globalization of finance and production
 the worldwide attack on pensions
 Third World debt and development
 the International Monetary Fund (IMF) and World Bank
 the media business and media economics
 the influence of foundations on politics and culture
 "what it means to be a leftist in a world that seems to have forgotten what that means"

In 1992, Henwood worked with John Liscio on The Liscio Report on the Economy, a financial advisory agency that publishes proprietary research. The newsletter is widely followed in the investment community. In 2000, after Liscio's death, Henwood and Phillipa Dunne, a business partner, inherited The Liscio Report and continue to publish it using the research techniques Liscio pioneered.

Henwood has written four books. His first, The State of the USA Atlas (1994), is a social atlas of the U.S. in the Pluto Press atlas series. This was followed in 1997 by Wall Street (Verso Books), in which Henwood describes the workings of high finance, and then by After the New Economy (The New Press, 2003), an analysis of the 1990s boom and bust. Henwood's most recent book is My Turn: Hillary Clinton Targets the Presidency (Seven Stories Press, 2016).

His articles have appeared in The Nation, Harper's Magazine, Grand Street, The Village Voice, Newsday, the Los Angeles Times, The Guardian, and Extra!. He is a contributing editor at The Nation.

Radio and other media 
Henwood began hosting the weekly radio show and podcast Behind the News in 1996. It is produced at KPFA and, formerly, WBAI. Henwood had been a regular contributor to Samori Marksman's show starting in 1989. Behind the News features interviews with activists, intellectuals, and academics, preceded by a summary of recent economic headlines. Notable guests include Noam Chomsky, James K. Galbraith, Christopher Hitchens, Lewis H. Lapham, George McGovern, Joseph Stiglitz, Gore Vidal, Yanis Varoufakis, and Slavoj Žižek.

On November 11, 2010, Henwood announced that his retirement from Behind the News in its current form, instead broadcasting from another venue and on his website. This change arose from an interim producer's decision to reschedule Henwood's show to Saturdays and reduce its airtime to twice a month despite Henwood's having raised substantial funds during the network's previous fund drive, conditions that Henwood found unacceptable.

Henwood occasionally interviews on other radio and television programs. He appeared in Lapham's dramatic documentary film The American Ruling Class.

Personal life 
Henwood is married to journalist Liza Featherstone; they live in Brooklyn with their son.

Books 
Henwood has written four books and is working on a fifth.
 State of the U.S.A. Atlas (1994), 
 Wall Street (1997), 
 After the New Economy (2003), 
 My Turn: Hillary Clinton Targets the Presidency (2015),

References

External links 
 Twitter account
 Left Business Observer (LBO)
 LBO News (blog)
 free downloadable version of Wall Street
 
 
 "Unconventional Wisdom: An Interview with Doug Henwood" by Bhaskar Sunkara (The Activist, 21 February 2010)
 "Ka-Pow! Bang! Crash! Down Goes Another Bubble!: Doug Henwood in Conversation with Christian Parenti", The Brooklyn Rail, (July–August 2009)
 "Economic Unorthodoxy: An Interview with Doug Henwood" (24 April 2004)
 "The 'New Economy' and the Speculative Bubble: An Interview with Doug Henwood" (Monthly Review, April 2001)
 "The Marxist Wall Street Couldn't Ignore", by Annalee Newitz, Salon.com, December 1998
 The Liscio Report on the Economy by Doug Henwood and Phillipa Dunne (blog)

American economics writers
American business and financial journalists
American alternative journalists
20th-century American journalists
21st-century American journalists
American print editors
Newsletter publishers (people)
The Nation (U.S. magazine) people
Pacifica Foundation people
American male journalists
Yale University alumni
People from Teaneck, New Jersey
People from Westwood, New Jersey
1952 births
Living people